This table shows a list of radio stations in the Volta region of Ghana, in no particular order, along with their various frequencies.

See also
Media of Ghana
 List of newspapers in Ghana
 List of radio stations in Ghana
Telecommunications in Ghana
New Media in Ghana

References 

Volta